TSS Duke of Albany was a passenger vessel operated by the London and North Western Railway and the Lancashire and Yorkshire Railway from 1907 to 1914. and also as HMS Duke of Albany from 1914 to 1916.

History

She was built by John Brown and Co. at Clydebank, Scotland, as part of a fleet of seven ships delivered by the company between 1892 and 1909. She operated on the Douglas-to-Heysham route as well as Liverpool-to-Belfast.

She was requisitioned by the Admiralty in 1914 for use by the Royal Navy during the First World War as an armed boarding steamer, serving as HMS Duke of Albany. The subsequent Court of Inquiry into the sinking determined that some casualties were the result of her depth charges exploding as she sank, and recommended "When any vessel is in imminent danger of sinking all Depth Charges should be rendered inoperative by inserting the safety catch so as to prevent loss of life...due to the depth charges exploding after the vessel has sunk."

Her ship's bell was salvaged in 2008.

References

1907 ships
Passenger ships of the United Kingdom
Steamships
Ships built on the River Clyde
Ships of the London and North Western Railway
Ships of the Lancashire and Yorkshire Railway
Armed boarding steamers of the Royal Navy
Maritime incidents in 1916
Ships sunk by German submarines in World War I
World War I shipwrecks in the North Sea